The 2014 Elite One is the 54th season of the Cameroon Top League.

Teams locations

League table

References

Cam
Cam
1
Elite One seasons